Harker Park Lake is located on the northwest face of Burro Mountain in Rio Blanco County, Colorado, United States. The lake is in the watershed of the White River and is entirely surrounded by the White River National Forest. The headwaters for the lake extend to the top of Burro Mountain at 3,092 m (10,143 ft). Water from Harker Park Lake drains into Sterry Lake, which in turn is the source for Sawmill Creek, a tributary of the South Fork of the White River.

References

Harker Park
Bodies of water of Rio Blanco County, Colorado
White River National Forest